Alain Cophignon (born 26 February 1963, in Paris) is a French writer, photographer and  aesthetician.

Biography 

A member of the Société des gens de lettres and co-founder of the "Société musicale française Georges Enesco", he is the author of a monograph devoted to this Romanian musician who lived in France, published by Fayard, hailed by the French-speaking press, the Internet or audiovisual as well as foreign; He is a laureate of the "Kastner-Boursault" prize awarded by the Académie des Beaux-Arts 2006 and the 2007.

Publications 
2015: Annie Pelzak : Outre mer
2010: Sous le tourbillon des couleurs : Isabelle Langlois
2006: Georges Enesco, Librairie Arthème Fayard (Bibliothèque des grands compositeurs), Paris, 692 p.  - George Enescu, translated into Romanian by Dominique Ilea, Éditions de l'Institut culturel roumain, Bucarest, 2009 
2003: Avant-propos to the work by George Bălan, Emil Cioran : la lucidité libératrice ?, Éditions Josette Lyon (Les Maîtres à penser du XXe), Paris, 234 p. 
1998/2001: L'œuvre musicale de Georges Enesco et sa pensée du destin, Proceedings of the international symposium "Georges Enesco" of musicology, Bucharest, and of the symposium of the International Academy of Villecroze
1999: La musique entre divertissement et défi existentiel : notes philosophiques, Actes du congrès international de Musicosophia, St. Peter, Germany

References

External links 
 Alain Cophignon at Fayard
 Alain Cophignon on Viadeo
 L'Œuvre musicale de Georges Enesco et sa pensée du destin by Alain Cophignon on Thèses.fr
 Alain Cophignon photographer
 Exposition Galerie L'Onde Courseulles sur mer Alain Cophignon July 2014 on YouTube

1963 births
Writers from Paris
21st-century French philosophers
20th-century French musicologists
21st-century French musicologists
21st-century French writers
Living people